Kunaal Roy Kapur (born 13 February 1979) is an Indian actor, best known for his roles in Delhi Belly (2011), Yeh Jawaani Hai Deewani (2013) and TVF Tripling (2016-2022).

Background and personal life
Kunaal comes from a family of mixed Hindu Punjabi and Indian Jewish heritage. His paternal grandfather, Raghupat Roy Kapur (or Raghupat Rai Kapoor), a Hindu of the Punjabi Khatri community, was a film producer. Kunaal's father was Kumud Roy Kapur, and his mother, Salome Roy Kapur, is of Indian Jewish descent. A dancer, dance instructor, stage choreographer and former Miss India, Salome Roy Kapoor is the daughter of Sam and Ruby Aaron, who were among the earliest accredited teachers of Ballroom and Latin American dancing in India.

Kunaal is the second of three brothers. His elder brother is Siddharth Roy Kapur, CEO of UTV and Disney India, and his younger brother is Aditya Roy Kapur. Actress Vidya Balan is married to Kunaal's brother Siddharth. 

Kunaal himself has been married to Shayonti Salvi since 2005. Shayonti is of mixed Maharashtrian and Sindhi heritage. The couple have a son named Zahaan and a daughter named Shanaz.

Career
Kapur started his acting career with the Indian soap Just Mohabbat (1997–98), which aired on Sony TV. He then appeared in a cameo role in the 2007 film, Loins of Punjab Presents opposite Shabana Azmi and Ishita Sharma. He was also seen in Panga Naa Lo.

As a director, Kunaal in 2006 directed a comedy, The President Is Coming. He adapted the play into film, to make his directorial debut with the mockumentary The President Is Coming (2009), starring Konkona Sen Sharma and Shernaz Patel, which opened to mixed reviews and was declared a "Semi-Hit".

Kapur appeared in six episodes of British-Indian comedy series Mumbai Calling (2009) as a call centre operator. He has appeared in Aamir Khan Productions' Delhi Belly (2011) alongside Imran Khan and Vir Das . Thereafter, he acted in Nautanki Saala (2013) with Ayushman Khurana and did a small role in Yeh Jawaani Hai Deewani (2013) with an ensemble cast, including Ranbir Kapoor, Deepika Padukone, and his younger brother Aditya Roy Kapur. Then he acted in Action Jackson directed by Prabhu Deva, along with Ajay Devgan, Sonakshi Sinha and Yami Gautam and Gollu Aur Pappu, along with Vir Das and Karishma Tanna. His last release was Azhar, where he played Reddy (Azharuddin's lawyer). Then in  the 2017 release - The Final Exit. He acted in Vishal Mishra directorial Hotel Milan alongside Zeishan Quadri, Karishma Sharma, Jaideep Ahlawat, Rajesh Sharma and Zakir Hussain, the film was based on anti-romeo squad and released in cinemas in 2018. Then he acted in an eight episode web series called Going Viral, which aired on Amazon prime and in Eros Now's comedy Side Hero. In 2019, he starred in another Mishra directored film, Marudhar Express. It was a sweet small town romantic film set in Kanpur. He was also seen on web series TVF Tripling (season 1 and 2) as Pranav.

Kunaal appeared in a short film named Smartphone which also starred Hina Khan and Akshay Oberoi.

Filmography

Films

Television

Music video

References

External links

 
 Filmography at Bollywood Hungama

Living people
Male actors from Mumbai
Film directors from Mumbai
Indian Jews
Indian male film actors
Indian male television actors
Indian theatre directors
Jewish male actors
Male actors in Hindi cinema
1979 births